Henry Clive (October 3, 1883–December 12, 1960) was an Australian-born American graphic artist and illustrator. Clive is known particularly for his illustrations in The American Weekly and cover series, which were posed for by screen celebrities.

Life and works
Clive was born Henry O'Hara in Australia and spent his childhood on a sheep ranch outside Melbourne. In later years Clive moved to  Hollywood, acted in silent films and became an art director in Charlie Chaplin's productions, where he starred as a villain in City Lights.
In 1950, Clive married former actress Acquanetta who then returned to acting for several years. When she retired from the movies in 1953, she became a disk jockey for radio station KPOL (AM) in Los Angeles.

Clive's 1925 Art Deco illustration Sultana for the Louis F. Dow Calendar Company was once sold for $22,705. Housed in the Estate of Charles Martignette, in 2010 Sultana was put on sale again at Heritage Auctions. Sultana was reproduced in The Great American Pin-Up by Charles G. Martignette and Louis K. Meisel.

References

External links
 Henry Clive and The American Weekly

20th-century American artists
American magazine illustrators
1880s births
1960 deaths
Australian emigrants to the United States